Lopburi railway station is a railway station in the centre of Lopburi, Thailand. Lopburi Station is the end of the double track section (Ban Phachi Junction – Lopburi) and starts the single track (Lopburi – Chiang Mai). This station can also be considered the end of commuter train services from Bangkok (only Northern Line–price 28 baht).

There are two large golden monkey sculptures that signify you are in Lopburi as the monkey is the symbol of Lopburi. The opposite side of the station building is an important archaeological site of Lop Buri, Wat Phra Sri Rattana Mahathat.

Train services
37 trains serve Lopburi Station. The services are the following:
Express 51/52: Bangkok – Chiang Mai – Bangkok
Local 401/402: Lopburi – Phitsanulok – Lopburi
Commuter 303/304: Bangkok – Lopburi – Bangkok
Local 409: Ayutthaya – Lopburi
Rapid 111/108: Bangkok – Den Chai – Bangkok
Special Express 9/10: Bangkok – Chiang Mai – Bangkok
Ordinary 201/202: Bangkok – Phitsanulok – Bangkok
Special Express 3/4: Bangkok – Sawankhalok/Sila At – Bangkok
Ordinary 209/210: Bangkok – Ban Takhli – Bangkok
Rapid 109/102: Bangkok – Chiang Mai– Bangkok
Ordinary 211/212: Bangkok – Taphan Hin – Bangkok
Ordinary 207/208: Bangkok – Nakhon Sawan – Bangkok
Commuter 301/302: Bangkok – Lopburi – Bangkok
Commuter 317/318: Bangkok – Lopburi – Bangkok
Special Express 13/14: Bangkok – Chiang Mai – Bangkok
Rapid 105/106: Bangkok – Sila At – Bangkok
Rapid 107/112: Bangkok – Den Chai – Bangkok
Special Express 7/8: Bangkok – Chiang Mai – Bangkok

References

External links

Railway stations in Thailand